The 137th Illinois Infantry Regiment was an infantry regiment from Illinois that served in the Union Army between June 5 and September 4, 1864, during the American Civil War.

Service 
The regiment was organized at Camp Wood, Quincy, Illinois, by Colonel John Wood, and mustered in for one-hundred day service on June 5. On June 9, the regiment was ordered to Memphis, Tennessee and on July 9, assigned to picket duty on the Hernando road, until September. On August 21, the regiment was involved in the Second Battle of Memphis repelling General Nathan Bedford Forrest's attack. The regiment was mustered out on September 4, 1864, at Springfield, Illinois. During its service the regiment had a total of thirty-four fatalities.

See also
List of Illinois Civil War Units

Notes

References

Bibliography 
 Dyer, Frederick H. (1959). A Compendium of the War of the Rebellion. New York and London. Thomas Yoseloff, Publisher. .
 Reece. Brigadier General J.N. (1900). The Report of Illinois from Military and Naval Department of the Adjutant General of the State of Illinois. Containing Reports for the Years 1861–1866. Springfield, Illinois. Journal Company, Printers and Binders.

Units and formations of the Union Army from Illinois
Military units and formations established in 1864
1864 establishments in Illinois
Military units and formations disestablished in 1864